Corporate Ghost is a Sonic Youth DVD released by DGC in 2004. It is a collection of their music videos from 1990 to 2002.

DVD was certified by Music Canada Gold in October 2004 for 5,000 sold copies.

The videos

 Dirty Boots
From the album Goo
Directed by Tamra Davis

 Tunic (Song for Karen)
From the album Goo
Directed by Tony Oursler

 Mary-Christ
From the album Goo
Directed by Steve Shelley

 Kool Thing
From the album Goo
Directed by Tamra Davis
Guest appearance by Chuck D

 Mote
From the album Goo
Directed by Ray Agony

 My Friend Goo
From the album Goo
Directed by Dave Markey, Joe Cole, Kim Gordon and Thurston Moore
Guest appearances by Joe Cole and Mike Watt

 Disappearer
From the album Goo
Directed by Todd Haynes

 Mildred Pierce
From the album Goo
Directed by Dave Markey
Guest appearances by Sophia Coppola and Sally STP

 Cinderella's Big Score
From the album Goo
Directed by Dave Markey
Guest appearances by Bill Bartell and Chris Cohen

 Scooter & Jinx
From the album Goo
Directed by Richard Kern
Guest appearances by Karen Disney and Linda Serbu

 Titanium Exposé
From the album Goo
Directed by Phil Morrison

 100%
From the album Dirty
Directed by Tamra Davis and Spike Jonze
Guest appearances by Jason Lee and Guy Mariano

 Sugar Kane
From the album Dirty
Directed by Nick Egan
Guest appearance by Chloë Sevigny

 Youth Against Fascism
From the album Dirty
Directed by Nick Egan

 Bull in the Heather
From the album Experimental Jet Set, Trash and No Star
Directed by Tamra Davis and Kim Gordon
Guest appearance by Kathleen Hanna

 Superstar
From the album If I Were a Carpenter
Directed by Dave Markey

 Little Trouble Girl
From the album Washing Machine
Directed by Mark Romanek
Guest appearance by Kim Deal

 The Diamond Sea
From the album Washing Machine
Directed by Spike Jonze, Lance Bangs, Dave Markey, Steve Paine and Angus Wall

 Sunday
From the album A Thousand Leaves
Directed by Harmony Korine
Guest appearances by Macaulay Culkin and Rachel Miner

 Hoarfrost
From the album A Thousand Leaves
Directed by Lee Ranaldo
Guest appearance by Leah Singer

 Nevermind (What Was It Anyway)
From the album NYC Ghosts & Flowers
Directed by frogme
Guest appearances by Pierre Bailly and Sleater-Kinney

 The Empty Page
From the album Murray Street
Directed by Thurston Moore and Chris Habib

 Disconnection Notice
From the album Murray Street
Directed by Tom Surgal
Guest appearances by Eszter Balint, Markus Miller, Linas Phillips and Clay Weiner

Bonus videos 

 Drunken Butterfly
From the album Dirty
Directed by Stephen Hellweg (MTV 120 Minutes/Sonic Youth homemade video contest winner)

 Swimsuit Issue
From the album Dirty
Directed by Morty (MTV 120 Minutes/Sonic Youth homemade video contest runner-up)

 Disappearer (Director's Cut)
From the album Goo
Directed by Todd Haynes

 Thurston Moore - Ono Soul
From the album Psychic Hearts
Directed by Dave Markey

Bonus material 

 Interviews
Lance Bangs
Tamra Davis
Kathleen Hannah
Todd Haynes
Richard Kern
Jason Lee
Dave Markey
Mike Watt

 Video commentaries
Tamra Davis
Todd Haynes
Richard Kern
Dave Markey
Phil Morrison
Mark Romanek
Sonic Youth
Tom Surgal
Mike Watt

 Other
Spike Jonze photo memory montage
"My Sonic Room": a fan film document by Patty Orsini from 1990.
Sonic Youth "Corporate Ghost" sticker

References

External links 

 AllMusic review
 PopMatters review
 Drowned in Sound review 
 Austin Chronicle review
 DVD Talk review

Sonic Youth video albums
Music video compilation albums
2004 video albums
2004 compilation albums
Sonic Youth compilation albums